This is a list of German military aircraft organised alphabetically by manufacturer.

AEG
(Allgemeine Elektricitäts-Gesellschaft)
 AEG B.I - reconnaissance
 AEG B.II - reconnaissance
 AEG B.III - reconnaissance
 AEG C.I - reconnaissance
 AEG C.II - reconnaissance
 AEG C.III - reconnaissance
 AEG C.IV - reconnaissance
 AEG C.IVN - night bomber
 AEG C.V - reconnaissance
 AEG C.VI - reconnaissance
 AEG C.VII - reconnaissance
 AEG C.VIII - reconnaissance
 AEG C.VIII Dr - reconnaissance triplane
 AEG D.I - fighter
 AEG DJ.I - armoured ground attack fighter
 AEG Dr.I - triplane fighter
 AEG G.I/K.I - bomber
 AEG G.II - bomber
 AEG G.III - bomber
 AEG G.IV - bomber
 AEG G.V - bomber
 AEG J.I - ground attack aircraft
 AEG J.II - ground attack aircraft
 AEG N.I - night bomber
 AEG PE - armoured triplane ground attack fighter
 AEG R.I - heavy bomber
 AEG R.II - heavy bomber project
 AEG Wagner Eule
 AEG Helicopter - helicopter observation platform, 1933

AGO
([[AGO Flugzeugwerke|AGO FlugzeugwerkeAktien Gesellschaft Otto/ Aeroplanbau Gustav Otto & Alberti]])
 AGO C.I & C.IW - pod and boom pusher reconnaissance biplane
 AGO C.II & C.IIW - pod and boom pusher reconnaissance biplane
 AGO C.III - pod and boom pusher reconnaissance biplane
 AGO C.IV - reconnaissance biplane
 AGO C.VII - reconnaissance biplane
 AGO C.VIII - reconnaissance biplane
 AGO DV.3 - fighter
 AGO S.I - prototype ground attack aircraft
 AGO Ao 192 Kurier - light liaison
 AGO Ao 225 - cancelled heavy fighter project

Akaflieg München
(Akaflieg)
 München Mü-18 Meßkrähe - research motor-glider for testing wing configurations from 1942-45

Albatros
(Albatros Flugzeugwerke GmbH)
 Albatros B.I - reconnaissance
 Albatros B.II - reconnaissance
 Albatros B.III - reconnaissance
 Albatros C.I - reconnaissance

 Albatros C.II - pusher reconnaissance
 Albatros C.III - reconnaissance
 Albatros C.IV - reconnaissance
 Albatros C.V - reconnaissanceGray, 1970, p.256
 Albatros C.VI - reconnaissance
 Albatros C.VII - reconnaissance
 Albatros C.VIII N - night bomber
 Albatros C.IX - reconnaissance
 Albatros C.X - reconnaissance
 Albatros C.XII - reconnaissance
 Albatros C.XIII - reconnaissance
 Albatros C.XIV - reconnaissance
 Albatros C.XV - reconnaissance
 Albatros D.I - fighter
 Albatros D.II - fighter
 Albatros D.III - fighter
 Albatros D.IV - fighter
 Albatros D.V & Va - fighter 
 Albatros D.VI - fighter
 Albatros D.VII - fighter
 Albatros D.VIII - fighter
 Albatros D.IX - fighter
 Albatros D.X - fighter
 Albatros D.XI - fighter
 Albatros D.XII - fighter
 Albatros Dr.I - triplane fighter
 Albatros Dr.II - triplane fighter
 Albatros G.I - bomber
 Albatros G.II - bomber
 Albatros G.III - bomber
 Albatros H.1 - high altitude record aircraft modified from SSW D.IV fighter
 Albatros J.I - ground attack
 Albatros J.II - ground attack
 Albatros L 3 - single seat reconnaissance
 Albatros L 9 - single seat reconnaissance
 Albatros L.65 - reconnaissance fighter biplane built in Lithuania
 Albatros L.68 - trainer
 Albatros L.69 - trainer
 Albatros L.70 - reconnaissance 
 Albatros L.74 - trainer
 Albatros L.75 - trainer
 Albatros L.76 - reconnaissance 
 Albatros L.77v - reconnaissance 
 Albatros L.78 - reconnaissance 
 Albatros L.79 - aerobatic/trainer
 Albatros L.81 - experimental aircraft to test the Elektron metal structure
 Albatros L.82 - trainer
 Albatros L.84 - fighter biplane, 1931
 Albatros L.101/Al 101 - sportsplane/trainer, 1930
 Albatros L.102/Al 102 - sportsplane/trainer, 1931
 Albatros L.103/Al 103 - sportsplane/trainer, 1932
 Albatros N.I - night bomber variant of Albatros C.VII
 Albatros W.1 - reconnaissance floatplane
 Albatros W.2 - reconnaissance floatplane
 Albatros W.3 - torpedo bomber floatplane
 Albatros W.4 - floatplane fighter
 Albatros W.5 - torpedo bomber floatplane
 Albatros W.8 - floatplane fighter

Alter
(Ludwig Alter Werke)
 Alter Type AI - fighter

Arado
(Arado Flugzeugwerke GmbH)
(For WWII projects see List of German aircraft projects, 1939-1945)
 Arado Ar 64 - fighter biplane
 Arado Ar 65 - fighter/trainer, re-engined Ar 64
 Arado Ar 66 - trainer/night fighter
 Arado Ar 67 - prototype  fighter biplane
 Arado Ar 68 - fighter biplane
 Arado Ar 69 - prototype trainer, 1933
 Arado Ar 76 - fighter/trainer
 Arado Ar 80 - fighter prototype
 Arado Ar 81 - prototype two-seat biplane, 1936
 Arado Ar 95 - patrol seaplane
 Arado Ar 96 - trainer
 Arado Ar 195 - lost to Fi-167 for aircraft carrier, floatplane
 Arado Ar 196 - ship-borne reconnaissance floatplane
 Arado Ar 197 - naval fighter derived from Ar 68
 Arado Ar 198 - reconnaissance
 Arado Ar 199 - seaplane trainer
 Arado Ar 231 - folding-wing U-boat reconnaissance prototype
 Arado Ar 232 Tausenfüßler - transport
 Arado Ar 233 - seaplane concept, 1940
 Arado Ar 234 Blitz - jet bomber
 Arado Ar 240 - heavy fighter
 Arado Ar 396 - trainer
 Arado Ar 440 - heavy fighter + attack
 Arado Ar 532 - cancelled transport

Argus
(Argus Motoren GmbH)
 Argus As 292 - see DFS Mo 12

Aviatik
(Automobil und Aviatik AG)
 Aviatik B.I - reconnaissance
 Aviatik B.II - reconnaissance
 Aviatik C.I - reconnaissance
 Aviatik C.II - reconnaissance
 Aviatik C.III - reconnaissance
 Aviatik C.V - reconnaissance
 Aviatik C.VI - reconnaissance
 Aviatik C.VII - reconnaissance
 Aviatik C.VIII - reconnaissance
 Aviatik C.IX - reconnaissance
 Aviatik D.I - fighter (Halberstadt D.II)
 Aviatik D.II - fighter 
 Aviatik D.III - fighter 
 Aviatik D.IV - fighter 
 Aviatik D.V - fighter 
 Aviatik D.VI - fighter 
 Aviatik D.VII - fighter 
 Aviatik Dr.I - triplane fighter
 Aviatik G.I - bomber
 Aviatik G.III - bomber
 Aviatik R.III - bomber

Bachem
( Bachem-Werke)
 Bachem Ba 349 Natter
 Ba BP 20 Manned Flak Rocket - early Ba-349s, some with landing gear for flight testing

Baumgärtl
(Paul Baumgärtl)
 Baumgärtl Heliofly I - backpack helicopter
 Baumgärtl Heliofly III/57 - backpack helicopter
 Baumgärtl Heliofly III/59 - one-man helicopter
 Baumgärtl PB-60 - experimental single-seat rotor kite
 Baumgärtl PB-63 - single-seat helicopter
 Baumgärtl PB-64 - single-seat helicopter

Akaflieg Berlin
(Flugtechnische Fachgruppe)
 Berlin B 9 - prone pilot research aircraft

 BFW
(Bayerische Flugzeugwerke)
 BFW CL.I - light reconnaissance/close support
 BFW CL.II - light reconnaissance/close support
 BFW CL.III - light reconnaissance/close support
 BFW Monoplane 1918
 BFW N.I - night bomber

Blohm & Voss
(Blohm & Voss and Hamburger Flugzeugbau)
(For WWII projects with no RLM designation see: List of German aircraft projects, 1939-1945)
 Blohm & Voss BV 40 - glider interceptor
 Blohm & Voss BV 138 - flying-boat, was designated Ha 138
 Blohm & Voss Ha 139 - transatlantic airmail floatplane, one modified for reconnaissance and minesweeping
 Blohm & Voss Ha 140 - torpedo bomber flyingboat prototype
 Blohm & Voss BV 141 - asymmetric reconnaissance prototypes
 Blohm & Voss BV 142 - reconnaissance/transport
 Blohm & Voss BV 143 - glide bomb prototype
 Blohm & Voss BV 144 - transport
 Blohm & Voss BV 155 - high-altitude interceptor, was Me 155
 Blohm & Voss BV 222 Wiking - transport flying-boat
 Blohm & Voss BV 238 - flying-boat prototype
 Blohm & Voss BV 246 Hagelkorn - glide bomb, "Radieschen" anti-radar version
 Blohm & Voss BV L.10 Friedensengel - torpedo glider
 Blohm & Voss BV L.11 Schneewittchen - torpedo glider

Bücker
(Bücker Flugzeugbau)
 Bücker Bü 131 Jungmann - trainer
 Bücker Bü 133 Jungmeister - trainer
 Bücker Bü 134 - trainer
 Bücker Bü 180 Student - trainer
 Bücker Bü 181 Bestmann - trainer
 Bücker Bü 182 Kornett - trainer

Caspar
(Caspar-Werke)
 Caspar D.I - twin-engine single-seat fighter
 Caspar U.1 - submarine aircraft

Daimler
(Daimler-Motoren-Gesellschaft Werke)
 Daimler CL.I - light reconnaissance/close support
 Daimler D.II - fighter
 Daimler G.I/R.I - heavy bomber
 Daimler G.II/R.II - heavy bomber
 Daimler L6/D.I - fighter
 Daimler L8 - fighter
 Daimler L9 - fighter
 Daimler L11 - parasol fighter
 Daimler L14 - parasol fighter

DFL
(Deutsche Forschungsanstalt für Luftfahrt - Research Institute in Braunschweig) 
 LT 9.2 Frosch - torpedo glider

DFS
(Deutsche Forschungsanstalt für Segelflug)
 DFS See Adler - seaplane research aircraft
 DFS Mo 6 - target glider prototypes, 1936
 DFS Mo 12 - target drone re-designated Argus As-292, first photo reconnaissance RPV
 DFS 39 - Lippisch-designed tail-less research aircraft
 DFS 40 - Lippisch-designed tail-less research aircraft
 DFS 108-49 Granau Baby - 1932 glider
 DFS 108-?? Kranich - 1935 glider
 DFS 108-68 Weihe - 1938 glider
 DFS 108-70 Olympia - planned 1940 Olympics glider
 DFS 194 - rocket-powered research aircraft, forerunner of Me 163
 DFS 228 - rocket-powered reconnaissance prototype
 DFS 230 - transport glider
 DFS 331 - transport glider prototype
 DFS 332 - wing section research
 DFS 346 - supersonic research, reached Mach 1 in USSR
 DFS 464 - project rocket carrier aircraft for DFS 360

DFW
(Deutsche Flugzeug-Werke)
 DFW Mars - reconnaissance
 DFW B.I - reconnaissance
 DFW B.II - reconnaissance
 DFW C.I - reconnaissance
 DFW C.II - reconnaissance
 DFW C.IV - reconnaissance
 DFW C.V - reconnaissance
 DFW C.VI - reconnaissance
 DFW D.I - fighter
 DFW Dr.I - triplane fighter
 DFW D.II - fighter
 DFW F 34 - fighter
 DFW F 37 - reconnaissance
 DFW R.I - heavy bomber
 DFW R.II - heavy bomber
 DFW R.III - cancelled heavy bomber
 DFW T.28 Floh - fighter prototype

Dornier
(Dornier Flugzeugwerke GmbH)
 Dornier Do C - bomber
 Dornier Do D - torpedo bomber for Yugoslavia
 Dornier Do H - fighter
 Dornier Do M - heavy bomber
 Dornier Do N - bomber for Japan
 Dornier Do P - heavy bomber
 Dornier Do 10/Do C1 - fighter prototype, 1931
 Dornier Do 11/Do F - medium bomber, 1931
 Dornier Do 12 Libelle - seaplane
 Dornier Do 13 - medium bomber, 1933
 Dornier Do 14 - seaplane prototype
 Dornier Do 16 Wal - reconnaissance flying-boat
 Dornier Do 17 - bomber/reconnaissance/night-fighter
 Dornier Do 18 - bomber/reconnaissance flying-boat, 1935
 Dornier Do 19 Uralbomber - four engine heavy bomber prototype
 Dornier Do 22 - torpedo bomber + reconnaissance flying-boat
 Dornier Do 23 - heavy bomber
 Dornier Do 24 - flying boat
 Dornier Do 26 - flying boat transport
 Dornier Do 214 - transport flying-boat prototype
 Dornier Do 215 - bomber/night-fighter
 Dornier Do 217 - bomber/night-fighter
 Dornier Do 288 - unofficial cover designation for captured B-17s used by KG 200.
 Dornier Do 317 - heavy bomber
 Dornier Do 335 Pfeil - twin-engine fighter-bomber
 Dornier Do 417 - twin-boom project
 Dornier Do 435 - Do 335 variant with longer wings
 Dornier Do 635 - Do 335 variant with twin fuselage

EMW
(Elektro Mechanische Werke)
 EMW A-4B piloted V-2 missile project
 EMW A-6 piloted V-2 missile project with aux. ramjet, origin of the X-15 rocketplane
 EMW A-9/A-10 piloted A-9/A-10 ICBM project

Euler
(Euler-Werke)
 Euler B.I - reconnaissance
 Euler B.II - reconnaissance
 Euler B.III - reconnaissance
 Euler C - reconnaissance pusher
 Euler D.I - fighter, copy of Nieuport
 Euler D.II - fighter
 Euler D - fighter (possibly D.III) 
 Euler Dr.I - triplane fighter
 Euler Dr.2 - triplane fighter
 Euler Dr.3 - triplane fighter
 Euler Dr.4 - triplane trainer
 Euler Pusher Einsitzer - fighter
 Euler Quadruplane - fighter

Fieseler
(Gerhard Fieseler Werke GmbH)
 Fieseler F-2/Fi 2 acrobatic sportsplane, 1932
 Fieseler F-5/Fi 5 acrobatic sportsplane/trainer, 1933
 Fieseler Fi 98 - biplane fighter, 1936
 Fieseler Fi 99 Jungtiger - light utility aircraft, 1938
 Fieseler Fi 103/V-1 - flying bomb
 Fieseler Fi 103R Series - Reichenberg manned V-1 suicide craft
 Fieseler Fi 156 Storch - STOL liaison aircraft
 Fieseler Fi 158 - research aircraft
 Fieseler Fi 166 - jet aircraft project
 Fieseler Fi 167 - ship-borne torpedo bomber/reconnaissance biplane
 Fieseler Fi 256 - development of Fi 156, two prototypes
 Fieseler Fi-333 - transport concept

Flettner
(Flettner Flugzeugbau GmbH and Anton Flettner G.m.b.H.)
 Flettner Gigant - helicopter, two huge rotors, 1933
 Flettner Fl 184 - auto-gyro, 1933
 Flettner Fl 185 - helicopter
 Flettner Fl 265 - based on Fl 185 but with intermeshing rotors
 Flettner Fl 282 Kolibri - naval reconnaissance helicopter
 Flettner Fl 336 - large transport helicopter project
 Flettner Fl 339 - flying platform project

Focke-Achgelis
(Focke-Achgelis & Co. GmbH)
 Focke Achgelis Fa 223 Drache - transport helicopter (prototype
 Focke Achgelis Fa 225 - towed assault helo-glider prototype
 Focke Achgelis Fa 266 Hornisse - helicopter prototype
 Focke Achgelis Fa 269 - tilt-wing pursuit helicopter project
 Focke Achgelis Fa 283 - jet helicopter project
 Focke Achgelis Fa 284 - heavy-lift helicopter project
 Focke Achgelis Fa 330 Bachstelze - towed autogyro prototype
 Focke Achgelis Fa 336 - scout helicopter prototype, 1944, manufactured in France postwar

Focke-Wulf
(Focke-Wulf Flugzeugbau GmbH)
 Focke-Wulf Fw 42 - bomber project, 1929
 Focke-Wulf Fw 44 Stieglitz - trainer
 Focke-Wulf Fw 56 Stosser - trainer
 Focke-Wulf Fw 57 - heavy fighter/bomber prototype
 Focke-Wulf Fw 58 Weihe - transport/trainer
 Focke-Wulf Fw 61 - helicopter prototype
 Focke-Wulf Fw 62 - ship-borne reconnaissance seaplane
 Focke-Wulf Ta 152 - Fw 190 variant
 Focke-Wulf Ta 154 Moskito - night-fighter
 Focke-Wulf Fw 159 - fighter prototype
 Focke-Wulf Ta 183 Huckebein - jet fighter prototype
 Focke-Wulf Fw 186 - autogiro reconnaissance prototype
 Focke-Wulf Fw 187 Falke - heavy fighter
 Focke-Wulf Fw 189 Uhu - reconnaissance
 Focke-Wulf Fw 190 Würger - fighter
 Focke-Wulf Fw 191 - medium bomber prototype
 Focke-Wulf Fw 200 Condor - transport/maritime patrol-bomber
 Focke-Wulf Super Lorin - ramjet-powered fighter project
 Focke-Wulf Fw 259 Frontjäger - fighter project
 Focke-Wulf Fw Ta 283 - ramjet fighter project
 Focke-Wulf Fw 300 - proposed long-range version of Fw 200
 Focke-Wulf Ta 400 - long-range bomber project
 Focke-Wulf P.VI Flitzer - twin-boom fighter, mock-up built
 Focke-Wulf Volksjäger - rocket-powered emergency fighter project
 Focke-Wulf Fw Triebflügel - thrust-wing ramjet coleopter project
 Focke-Wulf Rochen - circular wing project

Fokker
(Fokker Aviatik GmbH)
 Fokker A.I (M.8) - reconnaissance monoplane
 Fokker A.II (M.5L) - reconnaissance monoplane
 Fokker A.III (M.5K) - reconnaissance monoplane, armed version designated E.I
 Fokker B.I (1915) (M.10E) - reconnaissance biplane for Austria-Hungary
 Fokker B.II (1916) (M.10Z) - reconnaissance biplane for Austria-Hungary
 Fokker B.III (M.17) - reconnaissance/fighter for Austria-Hungary
 Fokker C.I - reconnaissance, first 70 examples built in Germany and shipped to Netherlands.
 Fokker D.I (M.18Z) - fighter
 Fokker D.II (M.17Z) - fighter
 Fokker D.III (M.20Z) - fighter
 Fokker D.IV - fighter
 Fokker D.V (M.22) - fighter
 Fokker D.VI - fighter
 Fokker D.VII - fighter
 Fokker D.VIII - fighter
 Fokker F.I/Dr.I - triplane fighter
 Fokker E.I - monoplane fighter
 Fokker E.II - monoplane fighter
 Fokker E.III - monoplane fighter
 Fokker E.IV - monoplane fighter
 Fokker M.6 - reconnaissance parasol
 Fokker M.7 - reconnaissance sesquiplane
 Fokker K.I (M.9) - battleplane
 Fokker M.16
 Fokker V.1 - prototype fighter
 Fokker V.2 - prototype fighter
 Fokker V.3 - prototype for Dr.I fighter
 Fokker V.4 - prototype for Dr.I fighter
 Fokker V.5 - prototype for Dr.I fighter
 Fokker V.6 - prototype triplane fighter
 Fokker V.7 - prototype triplane fighter
 Fokker V.8 - prototype 5 wing fighter
 Fokker V.9 - prototype biplane fighter
 Fokker V.10 - prototype triplane fighter
 Fokker V.11 - prototype for D.VII fighter
 Fokker V.12 - prototype for D.VI fighter
 Fokker V.13 - prototype for D.VI fighter
 Fokker V.14 - prototype for D.VI fighter
 Fokker V.16 - prototype for D.VI fighter
 Fokker V.17 - prototype monoplane fighter
 Fokker V.18 - prototype for D.VII fighter
 Fokker V.20 - prototype monoplane fighter
 Fokker V.21 - prototype for D.VII fighter
 Fokker V.22 - prototype for D.VII fighter
 Fokker V.23 - prototype monoplane fighter
 Fokker V.24 - prototype for D.VII fighter
 Fokker V.25 - prototype monoplane fighter
 Fokker V.26 - prototype for D.VIII monoplane fighter
 Fokker V.27 - prototype monoplane fighter
 Fokker V.28 - prototype for D.VIII monoplane fighter
 Fokker V.29 - prototype for parasol monoplane version of D.VII fighter
 Fokker V.30 - prototype for glider version of D.VIII monoplane fighter
 Fokker V.31 - D.VII fighter modified to tow V.30
 Fokker V.33 - prototype D.VI fighter
 Fokker V.34 - prototype D.VII fighter with BMW engine
 Fokker V.35 - prototype D.VII fighter variant
 Fokker V.36 - prototype D.VII fighter variant
 Fokker V.37 - armoured variant of V.27 monoplane
 Fokker V.38 - prototype for C.I
 Fokker W.4 - reconnaissance floatplane derived from M.7 

Friedrichshafen
(Flugzeugbau Friedrichshafen GmbH)
 Friedrichshafen C.I - reconnaissance
 Friedrichshafen D.I - fighter
 Friedrichshafen D.II
 Friedrichshafen D type Quadruplane - fighter
 Friedrichshafen FF.1
 Friedrichshafen FF.2
 Friedrichshafen FF.4
 Friedrichshafen FF.7
 Friedrichshafen FF.8
 Friedrichshafen FF.11
 Friedrichshafen FF.17
 Friedrichshafen FF.19
 Friedrichshafen FF.21
 Friedrichshafen FF.29 - reconnaissance floatplane
 Friedrichshafen FF.30
 Friedrichshafen FF.31 - pusher reconnaissance floatplane
 Friedrichshafen FF.33 - reconnaissance floatplane
 Friedrichshafen FF.34 - reconnaissance pusher floatplane
 Friedrichshafen FF.35 - torpedo bomber floatplane
 Friedrichshafen FF.37 - reconnaissance pusher
 Friedrichshafen FF.39 - reconnaissance floatplane
 Friedrichshafen FF.40 - reconnaissance floatplane
 Friedrichshafen FF.41 - torpedo bomber floatplane
 Friedrichshafen FF.43 - floatplane fighter
 Friedrichshafen FF.44 - reconnaissance floatplane
 Friedrichshafen FF.45
 Friedrichshafen FF.46
 Friedrichshafen FF.48 - floatplane fighter 
 Friedrichshafen FF.49 - reconnaissance/bomber floatplane
 Friedrichshafen FF.53 - torpedo bomber
 Friedrichshafen FF.54
 Friedrichshafen FF.59 - reconnaissance floatplane
 Friedrichshafen FF.60 - long range patrol triplane floatplane
 Friedrichshafen FF.61
 Friedrichshafen FF.62 - heavy bomber, may have been G.V
 Friedrichshafen FF.63 - floatplane monoplane
 Friedrichshafen FF.64 - reconnaissance floatplane
 Friedrichshafen FF.66
 Friedrichshafen FF.67
 Friedrichshafen FF.71
 Friedrichshafen G.I - heavy bomber
 Friedrichshafen G.II - heavy bomber
 Friedrichshafen G.III & IIIa - heavy bomber - heavy bomber
 Friedrichshafen G.IV - heavy bomber
 Friedrichshafen G.V
 Friedrichshafen N.I - night bomber

Geest
 1916 single-seat fighter

Geratwerk-Stargard
 Geratwerk-Stargard Lt.50 - glide bomb project

Germania
 Germania type B - reconnaissance, 1915
 Germania type C/K.D.D.  - fighter
 Germania C.I - reconnaissance
 Germania C.II - reconnaissance
 Germania C.IV - trainer
 Germania JM - unarmed single-seater, 1916

Gödecker
 Gödecker B type - trainer

Göppingen
(Sportsflugzeuge Göppingen)
 Göppingen Gö 1 Wolf I - sailplane, 1935
 Göppingen Gö 3 Minimoa - sailplane, 1936
 Göppingen Gö 4 - sailplane
 Göppingen Gö 5 - sailplane, 1937 (may be RLM #5, unlikely though) Goppingen Go 8 - development aircraft for Do 214
 Göppingen Gö 9 - development aircraft for pusher propeller used on Do 335 PfeilGotha
(Gothaer Waggonfabrik)
 Gotha LD.1/2/6/7 - training/reconnaissance/bomber biplanes
 Gotha LD.5 - single seat reconnaissance
 Gotha LE.3 Taube - monoplane
 Gotha WD.1 - reconnaissance floatplane
 Gotha WD.2/5/9/12/13/15 - reconnaissance floatplanes
 Gotha WD.3 - pusher reconnaissance floatplane
 Gotha WD.7  - twin-engined seaplane trainer/reconnaissance biplane
 Gotha WD.8 - single-engined seaplane trainer/reconnaissance biplane
 Gotha WD.11 - torpedo bomber floatplane
 Gotha WD.14/20/22 - torpedo bomber floatplanes
 Gotha WD.27 - large patrol floatplane
 Gotha G.I/UWD - heavy bomber
 Gotha G.II - heavy bomber
 Gotha G.III - heavy bomber
 Gotha G.IV - heavy bomber
 Gotha G.V - heavy bomber
 Gotha G.VI - asymmetric heavy bomber
 Gotha GL.VII - high speed reconnaissance bomber
 Gotha GL.VIII - high speed bomber
 Gotha G.IX - high speed bomber built by LVG
 Gotha G.X - high speed reconnaissance
 Gotha Go 145 - trainer
 Gotha Go 146 - transport, 1935
 Gotha Go 147 - STOL reconnaissance prototype
 Gotha Go 229 - jet flying wing fighter
 Gotha Go 242 - transport glider
 Gotha Go 244 - transport
 Gotha Go 345 - assault glider
 Gotha Ka 430 - transport glider

Halberstadt
(Halberstädter Flugzeugwerke GmbH)
 Halberstadt type B - reconnaissance
 Halberstadt B.I - reconnaissance
 Halberstadt B.II - reconnaissance
 Halberstadt B.III - reconnaissance
 Halberstadt C.I - reconnaissance
 Halberstadt C.III - reconnaissance
 Halberstadt C.V - reconnaissance
 Halberstadt C.VII - reconnaissance
 Halberstadt C.VIII - reconnaissance
 Halberstadt C.IX - reconnaissance
 Halberstadt CL.II - light reconnaissance/close support
 Halberstadt CL.IV - light reconnaissance/close support
 Halberstadt CLS.I - light reconnaissance/close support
 Halberstadt D.I - fighter
 Halberstadt D.II - fighter
 Halberstadt D.III - fighter
 Halberstadt D.IV - fighter
 Halberstadt D.V - fighter
 Halberstadt G.I - heavy bomber

Hannover
(Hannoversche Waggonfabrik AG)
 Hannover C.I - license-built Aviatik C.I
 Hannover CL.II - light reconnaissance/close support
 Hannover CL.III - light reconnaissance/close support
 Hannover CL.IV - light reconnaissance/close support
 Hannover CL.V - light reconnaissance/close support

Hannuschke
 Hannuschke monoplane - single seat scout, 1915

Hergt
 Hergt monoplane - fighter, 1918

Hansa-Brandenburg
(Hansa und Brandenburgische Flugzeugwerke)
 Hansa-Brandenburg B.I - reconnaissance
 Hansa-Brandenburg CC - flying boat fighter for Austrian Navy 
 Hansa-Brandenburg D
 Hansa-Brandenburg FB - flying boat 
 Hansa-Brandenburg FD
 Hansa-Brandenburg GDW - torpedo bomber floatplane 
 Hansa-Brandenburg GNW - reconnaissance floatplane 
 Hansa-Brandenburg GW - torpedo bomber floatplane 

 Hansa-Brandenburg KW - reconnaissance floatplane 

 Hansa-Brandenburg KDW - floatplane fighter
 Hansa-Brandenburg L.14 - fighter
 Hansa-Brandenburg L.16 - fighter

 Hansa-Brandenburg LW - reconnaissance floatplane 
 Hansa-Brandenburg NW - reconnaissance floatplane
 Hansa-Brandenburg W - reconnaissance floatplane
 Hansa-Brandenburg W.11 - floatplane fighter
 Hansa-Brandenburg W.12 - floatplane fighter
 Hansa-Brandenburg W.13 - flying boat for Austria-Hungary
 Hansa-Brandenburg W.16 - floatplane fighter
 Hansa-Brandenburg W.17 - floatplane fighter
 Hansa-Brandenburg W.18 - flying boat fighter
 Hansa-Brandenburg W.19 - reconnaissance floatplane
 Hansa-Brandenburg W.20 - flying boat fighter
 Hansa-Brandenburg W.23
 Hansa-Brandenburg W.25 - floatplane fighter
 Hansa-Brandenburg W.26 - reconnaissance floatplane
 Hansa-Brandenburg W.27 - floatplane fighter
 Hansa-Brandenburg W.29 - floatplane fighter
 Hansa-Brandenburg W.32 - floatplane fighter
 Hansa-Brandenburg W.33 - floatplane fighter
 Hansa-Brandenburg W.34

Heinkel
(Heinkel Flugzeugwerke)
 Heinkel He 37 - fighter biplane
 Heinkel He 38 - fighter biplane
 Heinkel He 43 - fighter biplane
 Heinkel He 45 - bomber/trainer
 Heinkel He 46 - reconnaissance
 Heinkel He 49 - fighter biplane
 Heinkel He 50 - reconnaissance/dive bomber biplane
 Heinkel He 51 - fighter/close-support biplane
 Heinkel He 59 - reconnaissance biplane floatplane
 Heinkel He 60 - ship-borne reconnaissance biplane floatplane
 Heinkel He 70 Blitz - transport, 1932
 Heinkel He 72 Kadett -  trainer
 Heinkel He 74 - fighter/advanced trainer prototype
 Heinkel He 100 - fighter
 Heinkel He 111 - bomber
 Heinkel He 111Z Zwilling - 2 He 111s joined with 5th engine used for towing
 Heinkel He 112 - fighter
 Heinkel He 113 - propaganda designation for He 100
 Heinkel He 114 - reconnaissance seaplane
 Heinkel He 115 - general-purpose seaplane
 Heinkel He 116 - transport/reconnaissance
 Heinkel He 118 - dive bomber, two to Japan, testbed for turbojet HeS 3A in 1939
 Heinkel He 119 - high speed recon bomber, record setter, two to Japan
 Heinkel He 162 Volksjäger - jet fighter
 Heinkel He 170 - reconnaissance/bomber, for Hungary
 Heinkel He 172 - trainer prototype
 Heinkel He 176 - rocket propelled experimental aircraft
 Heinkel He 177 - heavy bomber
 Heinkel He 178 - jet-engined experimental aircraft
 Heinkel He 219 - night-fighter
 Heinkel He 270 - reconnaissance/bomber prototype
 Heinkel He 274 - high-altitude bomber
 Heinkel He 277 - four-engined He-177, one modified for single "Superbomb" of unknown type
 Heinkel He 280 - jet fighter
 Heinkel He 343 - jet bomber project
 Heinkel P.1077 - rocket fighter, two prototypes 90% complete at defeat, further versions planned
 Heinkel Lerche - VTOL interceptor project
 Heinkel Wespe - VTOL interceptor project

Henschel
(Henschel & Son)
 Henschel Hs 117 - surface-to-air missile
 Henschel Hs 121 - fighter/trainer prototype
 Henschel Hs 122 - army co-operation, 2nd prototype became Hs 125
 Henschel Hs 123 - ground-attack biplane
 Henschel Hs 124 - heavy fighter/bomber prototype
 Henschel Hs 125 - fighter/trainer prototype
 Henschel Hs 126 - reconnaissance
 Henschel Hs 127 - high speed bomber prototype
 Henschel Hs 129 - ground-attack
 Henschel Hs 130 - high altitude jet reconnaissance/bomber prototype
 Henschel Hs 132 - jet dive bomber prototype
 Henschel Hs 293 - rocket propelled glide bomb
 Henschel Hs 294 - rocket propelled anti-shipping glide bomb
 Henschel Hs 295 - rocket propelled torpedo glider
 Henschel Hs 296 - rocket propelled torpedo glider
 Henschel Hs 297 - rocket propelled torpedo glider
 Henschel Hs 298 - air-to-air missile 
 Henschel Hs 315 - missile project
 Henschel Hs GT 1200 - anti-shipping rocket assisted glide bomb
 Henschel Zitterrochen Torpedofish - supersonic missile

Horten
(Horten brothers)
 Horten Parabola - parabolic flying wing prototype
 Horten H.XIII - delta jet fighter project
 Horten H.XVIIIB Amerika Bomber - project

Hütter
(Ulrich Hütter and Wolfgang Hütter)
 Hütter Hü 136 - dive bomber project, 1938
 Hutter Hü Fernzerstorer - 1942 destroyer project
 Hütter Hü 211 - Improved He 219, 2 built in 1944, destroyed in bombing raid

Jeannin
(Fabrik und Jeannin Flugzeugbau)
 Jeannin Taube - reconnaissance monoplane, 1914
 Jeannin biplane - reconnaissance biplane, 1915

Junkers
(Junkers Flugzeug und Motorenwerke AG)
 Junkers J 1 - experimental monoplane
 Junkers J 2/E.I - monoplane fighter, 1916
 Junkers J 3 - abandoned development of J 2
 Junkers J 4/J.I - ground attack, 1917
 Junkers J 7 - fighter prototype, led to D.I
 Junkers J 8/CL.I - ground attack, 1917
 Junkers J 9/D.I - fighter, 1917
 Junkers J 11/CLS.I - seaplane two-seat fighter
 Junkers A 20 - fighter
 Junkers A 35
 Junkers K 39 - bomber prototype
 Junkers K 47 - dive bomber
 Junkers Ju W33 - transport, 1926
 Junkers Ju W34 - transport/reconnaissance, 1933
 Junkers Ju 52 - transport/bomber
 Junkers Ju 86 - bomber/reconnaissance
 Junkers Ju 87 Stuka - dive-bomber
 Junkers Ju 88 - bomber/reconnaissance + night-fighter
 Junkers Ju 89 - heavy bomber prototype
 Junkers Ju 90 - heavy bomber prototype
 Junkers Ju 187 - prototype incomplete before cancellation
 Junkers Ju 188 Rächer - bomber
 Junkers Ju 248 - redesignated Me 263
 Junkers Ju 252 - transport
 Junkers Ju 287 - jet heavy bomber prototype
 Junkers Ju 288 - bomber prototype
 Junkers Ju 290 - long-range bomber prototype
 Junkers Ju 322 Mammut - assault glider
 Junkers Ju 352 Herkules - transport
 Junkers Ju 388 Stortebeker - reconnaissance/night-fighter
 Junkers Ju 390 - long-range bomber
 Junkers Ju 488 - heavy bomber
 Junkers EF 61 - high-altitude fighter/reconnaissance prototype
 Junkers EF 126 - pulsejet fighter completed in USSR in 1947
 Junkers EF 131 - Ju-287 derivative, completed in USSR in 1946
 Junkers EF 132 - advanced heavy  bomber
 Junkers EF 140 - bomber completed in the USSR postwar
 Junkers EF 150 - bomber completed in the USSR postwar
 Junkers EF 152 - bomber project, became East German Baade 152 airliner cancelled by Soviets

Klemm
(Klemm Leichtflugzeugbau GmbH)
 Klemm Kl 25 - sportplane
 Klemm Kl 31 - sportplane, 1931
 Klemm Kl 32 - sportplane, 1931
 Klemm Kl 33 - single-seat sportplane prototype, 1933
 Klemm Kl 35 - sportplane/trainer, 1935
 Klemm Kl 35Z Zwilling - twin fuselage Kl 35 to test theory of Messerschmitt Bf 109Z 
 Klemm Kl 36 - sportplane, 1934

Kondor
(Kondor Flugzeugwerke GmbH)
 Kondor Taube - reconnaissance
 Kondor W.1 - two-seater
 Kondor W.2C - reconnaissance
 Kondor B.I - trainer
 Kondor D.I - sesquiplane fighter
 Kondor D.II - biplane fighter
 Kondor D.6 - biplane fighter
 Kondor D.7 - sesquiplane fighter, 1917
 Kondor E.III & IIIa - monoplane fighter, 1918

KW (Danzig)
(Kaiserliche Werft Danzig - German Navy Shipyard)
 Kaiserliche Werft Danzig 404 - floatplane trainer
 Kaiserliche Werft Danzig 467 - floatplane trainer
 Kaiserliche Werft Danzig 1105 - floatplane trainer 
 Kaiserliche Werft Danzig 1650 - reconnaissance floatplane 

KW (Kiel)
(Kaiserliche Werft Kiel - German Navy Shipyard)
 Kaiserliche Werft Kiel 463 - floatplane trainer

KW (Wilhelmshaven)
(Kaiserliche Werft Wilhelmshaven - German Navy Shipyard)
 Kaiserliche Werft Wilhelmshaven 401 - floatplane trainer
 Kaiserliche Werft Wilhelmshaven 461 - floatplane trainer
 Kaiserliche Werft Wilhelmshaven 945 - floatplane fighter
 Kaiserliche Werft Wilhelmshaven 947 - reconnaissance floatplane

Laufer
 Laufer VE-RO - jet helicopter project

LFG Roland
(Luft-Fahrzeug-Gesellschaft)
 LFG Roland C.II - reconnaissance
 LFG Roland C.III - reconnaissance
 LFG Roland C.V - reconnaissance
 LFG Roland C.VIII - reconnaissance
 LFG Roland D.I - fighter
 LFG Roland D.II & IIa - fighter
 LFG Roland D.III - fighter
 LFG Roland D.IV - triplane fighter
 LFG Roland D.V - fighter
 LFG Roland D.VI - fighter
 LFG Roland D.VII - fighter
 LFG Roland D.VIII - fighter
 LFG Roland D.IX - fighter
 LFG Roland D.XIII - fighter
 LFG Roland D.XIV - fighter
 LFG Roland D.XV - fighter
 LFG Roland D.XVI - fighter
 LFG Roland D.XVII - monoplane fighter
 LFG Roland G.I - single engine heavy bomber
 LFG Roland W - reconnaissance floatplane
 LFG Roland WD - floatplane fighter
 LFG V 19 Straslund - submarine aircraft

Linke-Hofmann
(Linke-Hofmann)
 Linke-Hofmann R.I - heavy bomber
 Linke-Hofmann R.II - heavy bomber

Lippisch
(Alexander Lippisch)
 Lp DM-1 - delta-wing glider prototype
 Lp P.XIIIb - ramjet fighter project
 Lp GB 3/L - glide bomb

LTG
(Lufttorpedo-Gesellschaft Berlin)
 LTG FD 1 - fighter floatplane

Lübeck-Travemünde
(Flugzeugwerft Lübeck-Travemünde GmbH)
 Lübeck-Travemünde F.1 - floatplane reconnaissance
 Lübeck-Travemünde F.2 - floatplane reconnaissance
 Lübeck-Travemünde F.4 - floatplane reconnaissance
 Lübeck-Travemünde 844 - single-seat seaplane

LVG
(Luftverkehrsgesellschaft mbH)
 LVG B.I - reconnaissance/trainer
 LVG B.II - reconnaissance/trainer
 LVG B.III - trainer aircraft
 LVG C.I - reconnaissance, one example modified as torpedo bomber
 LVG C.II - reconnaissance
 LVG C.III - reconnaissance
 LVG C.IV - reconnaissance
 LVG C.V - reconnaissance
 LVG C.VI - reconnaissance
 LVG C.VII - reconnaissance
 LVG C.VIII - reconnaissance
 LVG C.IX - reconnaissance
 LVG D 10 - experimental fighter
 LVG D.II - fighter
 LVG D.III - fighter
 LVG D.IV - fighter
 LVG D.V - fighter
 LVG D.VI - fighter
 LVG E.I - armed reconnaissance monoplane, 1915
 LVG G.I - bomber aircraft
 LVG G.II - triplane bomber
 LVG G.III - Schütte-Lanz G.V triplane bomber built by LVG

Märkische
(Märkische Flugzeueg-Werke)
 Märkische D.I - fighter

Messerschmitt
(Messerschmitt Aktiengesellschaft)
 Messerschmitt Bf 108 Taifun - trainer/liaison
 Messerschmitt Bf 109 - fighter (also Me 109)
 Messerschmitt Bf 109Z Zwilling - two Me Bf 109Fs joined, prototype in 1943 but cancelled after damaged by bombs.
 Messerschmitt Bf 110 - heavy fighter/night-fighter
 Messerschmitt Bf 161 - reconnaissance prototypes, 1937
 Messerschmitt Bf 162 Jaguar - bomber prototype
 Messerschmitt Bf 163 STOL reconnaissance prototype, built by Weserflu
 Messerschmitt Me 163 Komet - rocket interceptor
 Messerschmitt Me 209 - speed-record aircraft
 Messerschmitt Me 209-II - fighter prototype unrelated to first Me 209
 Messerschmitt Me 210 - heavy fighter/reconnaissance
 Messerschmitt Me 261 Adolfine  -long-range reconnaissance
 Messerschmitt Me 262 Schwalbe - jet fighter/bomber
 Messerschmitt Me 263 - rocket interceptor
 Messerschmitt Me 264 Amerika - long-range bomber prototype
 Messerschmitt Me 265  attack aircraft project
 Messerschmitt Me 271bz Blitz Zerstorer - ramjet fighter project
 Messerschmitt Me 290 - maritime patrol/bomber
 Messerschmitt Me 309 - fighter prototype
 Messerschmitt Me 321 Gigant - transport glider
 Messerschmitt Me 323 Gigant - powered transport
 Messerschmitt Me 328 - pulsejet parasite fighter
 Messerschmitt Me 329 - heavy fighter project
 Messerschmitt Me 362 - project 3 jet military airliner
 Messerschmitt Me 410 Hornisse - heavy fighter/reconnaissance
 Messerschmitt Me 509 - fighter project, improved Me-309
 Messerschmitt Me 565 Vulkan - jet torpedo bomber project
 Messerschmitt Me 600 Bussard - provisional designation for development of Sack A.S.7
 Messerschmitt Me 609 Nacht Wulf - heavy fighter/bomber project
 Messerschmitt Me P.1101 - jet interceptor prototype w/variable sweep wing- basis for Bell X-5
 Messerschmitt Me P.1112 - jet fighter project, mock-up under construction in 1945

Mistel Composites
 DFS 230 and Klemm Kl 35 - test combination
 DFS 230 and Focke-Wulf Fw 56 - test combination
 DFS 230 and Messerschmitt Bf 109F - test combo, first Mistel combination
 Mistel 1 - warhead nosed Junkers Ju 88A-4 and Messerschmitt Bf 109F
 Mistel S-1 - trainer version of Mistel 1
 Mistel 2 - warhead nosed Junkers Ju 88G-1 and Focke-Wulf Fw 190A-8 or F-8
 Mistel S-2 - trainer version of Mistel 2
 Mistel 3 - warhead nosed Junkers Ju 88G and Focke-Wulf Fw 190A
 Mistel S-3A - trainer version of Mistel 3A
 Mistel Fuhrungsmaschine - long-range reconnaissance project with manned Ju 88H-4 with radar and Fw 190A-8 escort
 Gigant Mistel - Messerschmitt Me 323 and Messerschmitt Me 328 project

Nagler and Rolz
 Nagler and Rolz NR 54 - portable helicopter
 Nagler and Rolz NR 55 - portable helicopter

Naglo
(Naglo Bootswerfte)
 Naglo D.II - quadruplane fighter

NFW
(National Flugzeug-Werk GmbH Johannisthal)
 NFW B.I - trainer
 NFW E.I - experimental monoplane
 NFW E.II - experimental monoplane, 1917

Oertz
(Oertz)
 Oertz W 4 - flying boat
 Oertz W 5 - flying boat
 Oertz W 6 Flugschoner - tandem double biplane flying boat
 Oerta W 7 - flying boat
 Oertz W 8 - flying boat

Otto
(Gustav Otto Flugmaschinenfabrik & Otto Werke, Gustav Otto, München)
 Otto pusher - reconnaissance pusher biplane, 1914
 Otto B.I - reconnaissance tractor biplane, 1914
 Otto C.I - reconnaissance pusher, 1915
 Otto C.II - reconnaissance tractor biplane

Pfalz
(Pfalz Flugzeugwerke)
 Pfalz A.I - reconnaissance monoplane, licence built Morane-Saulnier L
 Pfalz A.II - reconnaissance monoplane
 Pfalz C.I - Rumpler C.IV under licence with minor improvements
 Pfalz E.I - monoplane fighter
 Pfalz E.II - monoplane fighter
 Pfalz E.III - monoplane fighter
 Pfalz E.IV - monoplane fighter
 Pfalz E.V - monoplane fighter
 Pfalz D type - fighter biplane
 Pfalz D.III & IIIa - fighter
 Pfalz D.IV - fighter
 Pfalz D.VI - fighter
 Pfalz D.VII - fighter
 Pfalz D.VIII - fighter
 Pfalz D.XII - fighter
 Pfalz D.XIV - fighter
 Pfalz D.XV - fighter
 Pfalz Dr.I - triplane fighter
 Pfalz Dr.II - triplane fighter

Reiseler, Walter
 Reiseler R-1 - helicopter
 Reiseler R-2 - helicopter

Rex
(Flugmaschine Rex GmbH)
 Rex 1915 Scout - fighter, 1915
 Rex 1916 Scout - fighter, 1916
 Rex 1917 Scout - fighter, 1917

Rohrbach, Adolph
 Rohrbach Cyclogyro - 1933 paddle-wing project

Rohrbach
(Rohrbach Metall-Flugzeugbau)
 Rohrbach Ro IV Inverness - patrol seaplane
 Rohrbach Ro IX Rofix - fighter
 Rohrbach Roterra - trimotor medium bomber, 1930, rejected by Reichswehr licensed to Czechoslovakia as Avia 46

Ruhrstahl
 Ruhrstahl X-4 - air-to-air missile (rocket-powered)

Rumpler
(Rumpler Flugzeugwerke)
 Rumpler Taube - reconnaissance monoplane
 Rumpler 4A/B.I - reconnaissance
 Rumpler 4E - flying boat, 1914
 Rumpler 4A 15 - bomber, 1915
 Rumpler 5A/C.I & Ia - reconnaissance
 Rumpler 5A 15/G.I - bomber, 1915
 Rumpler 5A 16/G.II - bomber
 Rumpler 6A/C.III - reconnaissance
 Rumpler 6B - fighter floatplane
 Rumpler 6G 2/G.III - bomber
 Rumpler 7C/C.IX  - reconnaissance
 Rumpler 7D - experimental fighters
 Rumpler 8C/C.X - reconnaissance
 Rumpler 8D/D.I - fighter
 Rumpler C.IV - reconnaissance
 Rumpler C.V - reconnaissance
 Rumpler C.VI - reconnaissance
 Rumpler C.VII - reconnaissance
 Rumpler C.VIII - reconnaissance

Sablatnig
(Sablatnig Flugzeugbau GmbH)
 Sablatnig SF-1 - two-seat floatplane
 Sablatnig SF-2 - reconnaissance/trainer floatplane
 Sablatnig SF-3 - floatplane fighter
 Sablatnig SF-4 - floatplane triplane fighter
 Sablatnig SF-5 - reconnaissance floatplane
 Sablatnig SF-6/B.I - trainer
 Sablatnig SF-7 - floatplane fighter
 Sablatnig SF-8 - floatplane trainer
 Sablatnig C.I - reconnaissance
 Sablatnig C.II - reconnaissance
 Sablatnig C.III - reconnaissance
 Sablatnig N.I - night bomber

Sack, Arthur
 Arthur Sack A.S.6 Bierdeckel - 1944 disk winged prototype

Sanger-Bredt
 Sanger Antipodal Bomber Silbervogel - jet bomber project, mock-up built

Schneider
(Flugmaschine Fabrik Franz Schneider GmbH)
 Schneider fighter 1918 - fighter

Schütte-Lanz
(Luftfahrzeugbau Schütte-Lanz)
 Schütte-Lanz C.I - reconnaissance pusher
 Schütte-Lanz D.I - fighter, possibly a copy of the Sopwith Tabloid
 Schütte-Lanz D.II - fighter prototype, re-engined D.I with Mercedes inline, 1915.
 Schütte-Lanz D.III - fighter
 Schütte-Lanz D.IV - fighter biplane
 Schütte-Lanz D.VI - monoplane fighter with lifting struts
 Schütte-Lanz D.VII - fighter biplane
 Schütte-Lanz Dr.I - triplane fighter
 Schütte-Lanz G.I - large fighting aircraft
 Schütte-Lanz R.I - heavy bomber project

Schwade
(Schwade Flugzeug und Motorenbau GmbH)
 Schwade 1914 Single-seater - pusher fighter biplane
 Schwade 1915 Single-seater - pusher biplane

Siebel
(Siebel Flugzeugwerke)
 Siebel Fh 104 Hallore - medium transport
 Siebel Si 201 - STOL reconnaissance aircraft prototype
 Siebel Si 202 Hummel - sportplane/trainer, 1938
 Siebel Si 204 - transport/crew trainer

SSW
(Siemens-Schuckertwerke)
 Siemens-Schuckert Bulldogge - single-seat monoplane, 1915
 Siemens-Schuckert B type - reconnaissance
 Siemens-Schuckert DD 5 - fighter biplane
 Siemens-Schuckert D.I & Ia - fighter
 Siemens-Schuckert D.IIe - fighter
 Siemens-Schuckert D.III - fighter
 Siemens-Schuckert D.IV - fighter 
 Siemens-Schuckert D.V - fighter
 Siemens-Schuckert D.VI - fighter
 Siemens-Schuckert Dr.II - fighter
 Siemens-Schuckert DDr.I - fighter
 Siemens-Schuckert E.I - fighter
 Siemens-Schuckert E.II - fighter
 Siemens-Schuckert L.I - heavy bomber, originally to have been G.III
 Siemens-Schuckert R.I - heavy bomber
 Siemens-Schuckert R.II - heavy bomber
 Siemens-Schuckert R.III - heavy bomber
 Siemens-Schuckert R.IV - heavy bomber
 Siemens-Schuckert R.V - heavy bomber
 Siemens-Schuckert R.VI - heavy bomber
 Siemens-Schuckert R.VII - heavy bomber
 Siemens-Schuckert R.VIII - heavy bomber
 Siemens-Schuckert Forssman - heavy bomber
 Siemens-Schuckert Torpedoglieter - series of radio control glide bombs

Škoda-Kauba (Occupied Czechoslovakia)
(Škoda-Kauba Flugzeugbau)
 Škoda-Kauba Sk V-5
 Škoda-Kauba Sk 257
 Skoda-Kauba Sk P.14 - ramjet fighter project

Soldenhoff
 Soldenhoff A.2
 Soldenhoff S 5 - experimental swept flying wing, 1936

Sombold, Heinz
 Sombold So 344 Rammschußjäger - rocket-powered interceptor project, 1944

Stöckel
 Stöckel Rammschussjäger - ramjet-powered interceptor project, 1944Stöckel Rammschussjäger - Annular manned bullet

Udet
(Udet Flugzeugbau)
 Udet U 12 Flamingo - trainer

Ursinus
(Oskar Ursinus)
 Ursinus Seaplane - fighter floatplane with retractable floats

VFW
(Vereinigte Flugtechnische Werke)
 VFW VAK 191B - VTOL fighter/ground attack

VFW-Fokker
(VFW-Fokker GmbH) 
 VFW-Fokker 614 - STOL transport

Wernher von Braun
(Wernher von Braun)
 Von Braun Interceptor rocket VTO interceptor project, 1939

Weserflug
(Weser Flugzeugbau GmbH)
 Weser We 271 - amphibian aircraft, prototype, 1939
 Weser P.1003 - tilt-rotor aircraft project
 Weser P.2127 - twin-boom aircraft project
 Weser P.2138 - large flying boat project

WNF
(Wiener Neustadter Flugzeugwerk)
 WNF-4
 WNF Wn 11
 WNF Wn 15
 WNF Wn 16
 WNF-342

Zeppelin Werke
(Zeppelin-Werke GmbH)
 Zeppelin-Lindau (Dornier) Rs.I - giant patrol seaplane
 Zeppelin-Lindau (Dornier) Rs.II - giant patrol seaplane
 Zeppelin-Lindau (Dornier) Rs.III - giant patrol seaplane
 Zeppelin-Lindau (Dornier) Rs.IV - giant patrol seaplane
 Zeppelin-Lindau (Dornier) D.I - fighter
 Zeppelin-Lindau (Dornier) C.I - two-seat military aircraft
 Zeppelin-Lindau (Dornier) C.II - two-seat military aircraft
 Zeppelin-Lindau (Dornier) CS.I - two-seat floatplane
 Zeppelin-Lindau (Dornier) CL.II - two seat close support/ground attack aircraft
 Zeppelin-Lindau (Dornier) V1 - experimental pusher to test stressed skin structure
 Zeppelin (Ja) C.I - reconnaissance, unrelated to previous C.I
 Zeppelin (Ja) C.II -reconnaissance, unrelated to previous C.II
 Zeppelin-Staaken V.G.O.I - heavy bomber
 Zeppelin-Staaken V.G.O.II - heavy bomber
 Zeppelin-Staaken V.G.O.III - heavy bomber
 Zeppelin-Staaken R.IV - heavy bomber 
 Zeppelin-Staaken R.V - heavy bomber 
 Zeppelin-Staaken R.VI & Type L seaplane - heavy bomber/patrol bomber
 Zeppelin-Staaken R.VII - heavy bomber
 Zeppelin-Staaken 8301 - heavy floatplane bomber
 Zeppelin-Staaken R.XIV - heavy bomber
 Zeppelin-Staaken R.XV - heavy bomber 
 Zeppelin-Staaken R.XVI - heavy bomber
 Zeppelin-Staaken E-4/20 - heavy bomber/transport
 Zeppelin Fliegende Panzerfaust (Flying Armored Fist) aircraft project
 Zeppelin Rammer ramming aircraft project

See also
 List of aircraft of the French Air Force during World War II
 List of aircraft of the Luftwaffe, World War II
 List of World War II Luftwaffe aircraft engines
 Idflieg aircraft designation system (World War I aircraft) List of RLM aircraft designations (3rd Reich aircraft only) List of Sailplanes
 List of Luftwaffe aircraft by manufacturer, World War II

References

Bibliography
 
 Dressel, Joachim and Griehl, Manfred.  Bombers of the Luftwaffe. Arms and Armour, 1994. .
 Dressel, Joachim and Griehl, Manfred.  Fighters of the Luftwaffe. Arms and Armour Press, 1993. .
 Donald, David (Editor) (1994). Warplanes of the Luftwaffe. London: Aerospace Publishing. .
 Gray, Peter & Thetford, Owen. German Aircraft of the First World War”. London, Putnam. (2nd Ed.) 1970. .
 Green, William. The Warplanes of the Third Reich. Doubleday & Co., New York. 1970.
 Nowarra, Heinz J.. Die Deutsche Luftruestung 1933-1945 - Vol.1 - AEG-Dornier. Bernard & Graefe Verlag. 1993. Koblenz.  (Gesamtwek),  (Band 1)
 Smith, J.R. and Antony L Kay. German Aircraft of the Second World War. London: Putnam, 1972. .Hitler's Luftwaffe, 1990, German Helicopters 1928-1945, 1990, 
Bruno Lange: Typenhandbuch der deutschen Luftfahrttechnik.'' (= Die deutsche Luftfahrt. Band 9). Bernard & Graefe, Koblenz 1986,

External links
  Virtual Aviation Museum
 Luftwaffe '46
 

Germany by manufacturer, List of military aircraft of
Aircraft